Gene Ammons in Sweden is a live album by saxophonist Gene Ammons recorded in Åhus in 1973 and released on the Enja label in 1981.

Reception
The Allmusic review states, "It's not that well recorded, but Ammons' playing is furious, funky, and riveting".

Track listing 
 Billie's Bounce" (Charlie Parker) - 11:25   
 "There Is No Greater Love" (Isham Jones, Marty Symes) - 8:35   
 "Polka Dots and Moonbeams" (Johnny Burke, Jimmy Van Heusen) - 4:58   
 "Lover Man" (Jimmy Davis, Ram Ramirez, James Sherman) - 5:35   
 "Ahus Jazz" (Horace Parlan) - 7:55

Personnel 
Gene Ammons - tenor saxophone 
Horace Parlan - piano
Red Mitchell - bass
Ed Jones - drums

References 

1981 live albums
Enja Records live albums
Gene Ammons live albums